Lee Sung-hye (Hangul: 이성혜, Hanja: 李聖惠, born November 11, 1988) is a Korean beauty pageant titleholder who was crowned Miss Korea 2011 and was represented her country in the Miss Universe 2012 pageant.

Early life
Sunghye is a major in fashion design at the Parsons School of design in New York City.

Miss Korea 2011
Lee was crowned Miss Korea 2011 in an event held at the Sejong Center for the Performing Arts in Seoul on 3 August 2011 beating out 53 other contestants.

As Miss Korea 2011 she competed at Miss Universe 2012 but did not place.

References

External links

 
 Miss Korea 2011 Profile
 Miss Universe 2012 profile

1988 births
Living people
Miss Korea winners
Miss Universe 2012 contestants
Parsons School of Design alumni